Reijo Untamo Höykinpuro (born 16 August 1933) is a Finnish long-distance runner. He competed in the men's 5000 metres at the 1960 Summer Olympics.

References

1933 births
Living people
Athletes (track and field) at the 1960 Summer Olympics
Finnish male long-distance runners
Olympic athletes of Finland
Place of birth missing (living people)